Justine Alexandra Roberts Tunney (born 1984) is a software developer and a former activist for Occupy Wall Street.

Biography 
Tunney started publishing software in 1998. She built software for other hackers and fiddled with AOL.

In 1999, at the age of 14, Tunney used the nickname "Oogle". Around that time, Christopher Neuman registered the domain name oogle.com. In 2012, Google tried to obtain the domain in a UDRP case but did not meet all ICANN requirements for it. Neuman stated that he registered it because he: "intended to collaborate with Tunney".

In July 2011, Tunney registered the @occupywallst Twitter handle and occupywallst.org domain, which became the main online hub for the Occupy movement. 

In 2012, Tunney started working for Google as a software engineer. In March 2014, Tunney petitioned the US government on We the People to hold a referendum asking for support to retire all government employees with full pensions, transfer administrative authority to the technology industry, and appoint the executive chairman of Google Eric Schmidt as CEO of America. In 2016, Tunney discovered that open-source software projects on GitHub depended on an Apache Commons library with a security vulnerability. She started opening pull requests with fixes and recruited 50 fellow Google employees to help during their 20% time. They used BigQuery to enumerate vulnerable projects, of which 2,600 were found. She noted that the San Francisco Municipal Transportation Agency became a ransomware victim due to the vulnerability.

Tunney wrote a C library and web server named Redbean 2 that runs on multiple platforms as a single binary. The Register called the project "a bunch of almost unbelievably clever tech tricks".

Notes

References

External links 
 
 Google Inc. v. Blue Arctic LLC

Living people
American LGBT people
American activists
American bloggers
People associated with computer security
Transgender women
American computer programmers
American women bloggers
21st-century American women
1984 births